Census Division No. 2 (Steinbach Area) is a census division located within the Eastman Region in the Canadian province of Manitoba. Unlike in some other provinces, census divisions do not reflect the organization of local government in Manitoba. These areas exist solely for the purposes of statistical analysis and presentation; they have no government of their own. 

It is located between the city of Winnipeg, the Red River Valley and the US–Canada border. 

The city of Steinbach is the largest population centre in the region. The economy of the area is mainly farming. Also included in the division are two of the three reserves of the Roseau River Anishinabe First Nation. The Trans-Canada Highway runs through Eastman Region.

Demographics 

Cities

Steinbach

Towns

Niverville
Ste. Anne

Villages

St.-Pierre-Jolys

Rural municipalities

De Salaberry
Emerson – Franklin (part in Division No. 3)
Hanover
La Broquerie
Ritchot
Ste. Anne
Taché

First Nations reserves

 Roseau Rapids 2A
 Roseau River 2

References

External links
 Eastman Regional Profile

02